Saluva Narasimha Deva Raya (or Saluva Narasimha, Saluva Narasimha I; 1431–1491 CE) was an emperor of the Vijayanagara Empire from the Saluva Dynasty. A patron of the Madhwa saint Sripadaraya, he authored the Sanskrit work Rama Bhyudayam. He also patronised Kannada poet Kavi Linga.

In 1452, he was given the title Maha Mandaleshwara of Chandragiri during the reign of Mallikarjuna Raya. His father Saluva Gunda was the governor of Chandragiri.

After the death of Virupaksha Raya II and arrival of Prauda Deva Raya as the new monarch of Vijayanagar, the empire plunged into neglect and anarchy. Seeing that a military coup was the only hope to save the kingdom, he despatched the son of Tuluva Isvara, Tuluva Narasa Nayaka to the imperial capital of Vijayanagara. The incumbent king Prauda Raya fell, thus starting the rule of Saluva Narasimha. The writings of Nuniz gives a graphic account of how Narasa Nayaka went to Vijayanagara and found it completely unguarded, even all the way to the harem.

As king, Saluva Narasimha tried to expand the empire, though he continually faced difficulties caused from rebelling chieftains. By 1491, he lost Udayagiri to Gajapati Kapilendra Deva of Orissa while the Chiefs of Ummattur in the Mysore region, Saluvas of Hadavalli and Santharas of Karkala from coastal Karnataka region, Srirangapatna and Sambetas of Peranipadu in Cuddapah still remained threats to the empire.
 
Saluva Narasimha's war with the Gajapatis over Udayagiri in 1489 proved disastrous when he was taken prisoner and released later after giving up the fort and surrounding areas to the Gajapatis of Orissa. However he was successful at conquering the western ports of Kannada country of Mangalore, Bhatkal, Honnavar and Bakanur. This success enabled him to trade for swift horses with the Arabs. He took more efforts in the upkeep of his cavalry and army in general.

Saluva Narasimha would die in 1491 with sons that were too young to ascend to the throne. Their guardianship was entrusted to Narasa Nayaka, a loyal general and minister from the Tuluva family.

Notes

References
 Dr. Suryanath U. Kamat, Concise History of Karnataka, 2001, MCC, Bangalore (Reprinted 2002)
 Prof K.A. Nilakanta Sastry, History of South India, From Prehistoric times to fall of Vijayanagar, 1955, OUP, New Delhi (Reprinted 2002)

External links
APonline article
Ourkarnataka article
Sangama article

1491 deaths
People of the Vijayanagara Empire
Hindu monarchs
1485 births
Indian Hindus
15th-century Indian monarchs